Steve Vawamas  is an Italian bassist, known for his collaborations with various metal bands as Athlantis, Shadows of Steel, Mastercastle, and The Dogma.

Biography
He started playing when he was 14 years old on the example of famous hard rock and heavy metal bass players as Steve Harris. 
In 1997 Steve started his collaboration with the singer Wild Steel, who got him involved in his band Shadows of Steel: with them he recorded 2 albums: Shadows of Steel and Twilight, published under the label Underground Symphony. Eventually, with Wild Steel he started the project Prometeo which had been temporarily interrupted.
In 2003 he played live with Glenn Hughes (Deep Purple) in Genova and in meantime started to collaborate with various bands and different generes.
Still in 2003 started his own project Athlantis: he recorded Athlantis (2003), Metalmorphosis (2008), Metal will never die (2012).
In 2006 he joined The Dogma and recorded in Germany the CD Black Roses, with Mike Terrana on drums (Masterplan, Sinfonica, Malmsteen, Macalpine, etc.).
In the following years, he wasoften asked to collaborate in studio and live with artists as Tommy Talamanca (Sadist), Trevor (Sadist), Pino Scotto (Vanadium), Pier Gonella (Mastercastle, Necrodeath) and others.
In 2008 he was chosen to join Mastercastle with whom he recorded the albums The Phoenix (2009), Last Desire (2010), Dangerous Diamonds (2011) and On Fire (2013) under the label Lion Music, Enfer (2014) under the label Scarlet Records. In April of this same year, with this band, he participated with other international artists (among Jennifer Batten) to the project ‘Embrace the Sun’, a double album produced by Lion Music, for a donation to the Japanese Red Cross for the earthquake of March 11, 2011.
In 2012 he worked on his parallel project Athlantis, signing a contract with the German Rock it up and the third album M.W.N.D. was released with Pier Gonella (Mastercastle-Necrodeath) on guitar, Enrico Sidoti on drums and Jack Spider on vocals. This CD has other artists as GiorgiaGueglio (Mastercastle), Fausto Ciapica, Alessio Calandriello and Gianfranco ‘Pino’ Puggionias special guests.
In 2011 he take part to the "MusicArt Project", a remake of the Pink Floyd album ‘The Dark Side of the Moon’ called ‘The Black Side of the Moon’, with Pier Gonella and Giorgia Gueglio (Mastercastle), Peso (Necrodeath), Andrea Vulpani.
In 2013 Mastercastle went on with his discography story releasing the album "On Fire", with the famous drummer John Macaluso (Malmsteen, ARK, T.N.T. and other bands…).
In the same year other 2 projects were achieved: Tragedian, led by the German Gabriele Palermo, released by the label Rock it Up and Shadows of Steel, released for the label Underground Symphony.
Still in 2013 the fourth Athlantis CD was recorded and released in 2014 for the German label Rock it Up, including Pier Gonella and Gianfranco Puggioni on guitars, Francesco La Rosa on drums, Alessio Calandriello (Lucid Dreams) and Roberto Tiranti (Labyrinth, Steff Burns…) on vocals and the German Carsten Shultz.
In 2015 he was part of Pier Gonella's project Odyssea Storm in different tunes.

Discography
1997: Shadows of Steel (with the band Shadows of Steel)
1998: Twilight (with the band Shadows of Steel)
2000: Heroes (with the band Shadows of Steel)
2002: Second Floor (with the band Shadows of Steel)
2003: Athlsntis (with the band Athlantis)
2006: Black Roses (with the band The Dogma)
2008: Metalmorphosis (with the band Athlantis)
2009: The Phoenix (with the band Mastercastle)
2010: Last Desire (with the band Mastercastle)
2011: Dangerous Diamonds (with the band Mastercastle)
2012: M.W.N.D. (with the band Athlantis)
2012: The Black Side of the Moon (with the band MusicArt Project)
2013: On Fire (with the band Mastercastle)
2013: Decimation (with the band Tragedian)
2013: Crown Of Steel (with the band Shadows of Steel)
2014: Enfer (with the band Mastercastle)
2015: Storm (with the band Odyssea)
2016: Orion (with the band Bellathrix)
2016: Sun & Light (with the band Galleano and Friends)

References

External links

Italian bass guitarists
Male bass guitarists
Living people
Year of birth missing (living people)
Place of birth missing (living people)
Mastercastle members